New Hanover Island,, also called Lavongai, is a large volcanic island in the New Ireland Province of Papua New Guinea.

In the interior the Tirpitz Range reaches a height of 2,800 feet.

Culture
Friedrich Ratzel in The History of Mankind reported in 1896, when discussing Melanesian ornament, that there were luxurious feather ornament displays in New Hanover, showing much taste in the combination of forms and colours with vegetable fibres and beads on sticks. An example was a delicately formed face in feather-mosaic forming the head of a hairpin.

See also
Johnson cult (so called)
List of volcanoes in Papua New Guinea

References

External links

Islands of Papua New Guinea
Volcanoes of Papua New Guinea
New Ireland Province